Daniel le Pelley, 12th Seigneur of Sark (1704–1752) was Seigneur of Sark from 1742 to 1752.

1704 births
1752 deaths
Seigneurs of Sark
Year of birth unknown
Daniel